Thomas De Armen Stacks, known professionally as Tom Stacks (November 9, 1899 – February 19, 1936) was an American musician who was the lead singer, drummer, and sound effects man for many of Harry Reser's late-1920s jazz and novelty bands that included the Six Jumping Jacks.

Early life 
Born on November 9, 1899, in Harrisburg, Pennsylvania, he was the son of Elmer E. and Margaret A. Stacks, both of whom were also Pennsylvania natives.

Career 
Stacks was an active musician by early 1920. During his career, Stacks worked as the lead singer and drummer for many of Harry Reser's bands. In 1936, he lived in the Jackson Heights neighborhood of Queens. He died in 1936 when the restaurant he was performing in caught fire.

References

American jazz drummers
American jazz singers
1899 births
1936 deaths
20th-century American singers
20th-century American drummers
American male drummers
20th-century American male musicians
American male jazz musicians